Angélica Larios Delgado (born March 13, 1981) is a Mexican sabre fencer. She won a silver medal, as a member of the Mexican fencing team, in the same weapon at the 2011 Pan American Games in Guadalajara, Mexico.

Larios represented Mexico at the 2008 Summer Olympics in Beijing, where she competed as a lone fencer in the women's individual sabre event. She lost the first preliminary round match to Spain's Araceli Navarro, with a score of 4–15.

References

External links
Profile – FIE
NBC Olympics Profile

Mexican female sabre fencers
Living people
Olympic fencers of Mexico
Fencers at the 2008 Summer Olympics
Fencers at the 2011 Pan American Games
Pan American Games silver medalists for Mexico
Fencers from Mexico City
1981 births
Pan American Games medalists in fencing
Medalists at the 2011 Pan American Games
20th-century Mexican women
21st-century Mexican women